Tulare County is a county located in the U.S. state of California. As of the 2020 census, the population was 473,117. The county seat is Visalia. The county is named for Tulare Lake, once the largest freshwater lake west of the Great Lakes. Drained for agricultural development, the site is now in Kings County, which was created in 1893 from the western portion of the formerly larger Tulare County.

Tulare County comprises the Visalia-Porterville, CA Metropolitan Statistical Area. The county is located south of Fresno, spanning from the San Joaquin Valley east to the Sierra Nevada.

Sequoia National Park is located in the county, as is part of Kings Canyon National Park, in its northeast corner (shared with Fresno County), and part of Mount Whitney, on its eastern border (shared with Inyo County). As of the 2020 census, the population was 473,117, up from 442,179 at the 2010 census.

History

The land was occupied for thousands of years by the Yokuts. Beginning in the eighteenth century, Spain established missions to colonize California and convert the American Indians to Christianity. Comandante Pedro Fages, while hunting for deserters in the Central Valley in 1772, discovered a great lake surrounded by marshes and filled with rushes; he named it Los Tules (the tules). It is from this lake that the county derives its name. The root of the name Tulare is found in the Nahuatl word tullin, designating cattail or similar reeds.

In 1805, 1806 and again in 1816, the Spanish out of Mission San Luis Obispo explored Lake Tulare.   
Bubal was a native village located on the Western side of Lake Tulare. In 1816, Fr. Luis Martinez of Mission San Luis Obispo arrived at Bubal with soldiers and armed Christian Northern Chumash pressuring the people to send their children for baptism at his mission on the coast.  Conflict broke out, and Martinez's party burned Bubal to the ground, destroying the cache of food harvested for the winter.  Although Bubal's relationship with the Christian Salinans under Fr. Cabot at Mission San Miguel was better, between 1816 and 1834, Bubal was a center of native resistance. The marshes around Lake Tulare were impenetrable by Spanish horses, which gave the Yokuts a military advantage.  At one point, the Spanish considered building a presidio with 100 soldiers at Bubal to control the resistance, but that never came to pass. The Spanish called the natives of the area Tulareños, and before 1816 and after 1834, they were incorporated into Mission San Miguel and Mission San Luis Obispo.

After Mexico achieved independence, it continued to rule California. After the Mexican Cession and the Treaty of Guadalupe Hidalgo in 1848, the area became part of the United States. Tulare County was soon formed from parts of Mariposa County only four years later in 1852. There were two early attempts to split off a new Buena Vista County in 1855 and Coso County in 1864, but both failed. Parts of the county's territory were given to Fresno County in 1856, to Kern County and Inyo County in 1866 and to Kings County in 1893.

The infectious disease Tularemia caused by the bacterium Francisella tularensis is named after Tulare County.

In 1908 Colonel Allen Allensworth and associates founded Allensworth as a black farming community. They intended to develop a place where African Americans could thrive free of white discrimination. It was the only community in California founded, financed and governed by African Americans.  While its first years were highly successful, the community encountered environmental problems from dropping water tables which eventually caused it to fail. Today the historic area is preserved as the Colonel Allensworth State Historic Park, which is listed on the National Register of Historic Places.

Geography

Adjacent counties

 Fresno County—north
 Inyo County—east
 Kern County—south
 Kings County—west

Lakes

Rivers

Parks

National protected areas
 Blue Ridge National Wildlife Refuge
 Giant Sequoia National Monument (part)
 Inyo National Forest (part)
 Kings Canyon National Park (part)
 Pixley National Wildlife Refuge
 Sequoia National Forest (part)
 Sequoia National Park

Sequoia National Park 

Sequoia National Park is a national park in the southern Sierra Nevada, east of Visalia. It was established in 1890 as the second U.S. national park, after Yellowstone. The park spans . The park is south of and contiguous with Kings Canyon National Park; the two are administered by the National Park Service as one unit, called Sequoia and Kings Canyon National Parks.

Flora 
Tulare County is rich in native plant species due in part to a diversity in habitats, including creeks, rivers, hills, and mountains.  Native plants include incense cedar (Calocedrus decurrens), valley oak (Quercus lobata), California bay (Umbellularia californica), manzanita (Arctostaphylos manzanita), Salvia spathacea, mountain mahogany (Cercocarpus betuloides), milkweed (Asclepias speciosa), Epilobium cleistogamum, monkeyflower (Mimulus), Penstemon, California melic (Melica californica), and deer grass (Muhlenbergia rigens).

Government and policing

Administration
Tulare County is a general law county under the California Constitution. That is, it does not have a county charter. The county is governed by a five-member Board of Supervisors. Supervisors are elected by districts for four-year terms. There are no term limits in effect. The Chairman and Vice-Chairman are elected annually by the Board of Supervisors from among its members.

Sheriff
The Tulare County Sheriff provides court protection, county jail operation, patrol and detective functions in the unincorporated areas of the county. Incorporated towns have municipal police departments or contract with the Sheriff for their police operations.

Transportation

Major highways
 State Route 43
 State Route 63
 State Route 65
 State Route 99
 State Route 137
 State Route 180
 State Route 190
 State Route 198
 State Route 201
 State Route 216
 State Route 245

Public transportation
Tulare County Area Transit (TCaT) provides a intracounty bus service linking the population centers. One TCaT route connects to Delano in Kern County.

The cities of Tulare, Porterville, and Visalia have their own local intracity bus services.

Greyhound and Orange Belt Stages provide long-distance, intercity bus service outside the county.

Airports
The airport offers general aviation to the public; it is also home to Porterville Air Attack Base on the south part of the airport. The Visalia Municipal Airport is a city-owned airport for the city of Visalia, California. Mefford Field is a city-owned general aviation airport located in Tulare.

The nearest full-operation commercial airports are Bakersfield's Meadows Field Airport to the south, and Fresno's Fresno Yosemite International Airport to the north.

Crime 

The following table includes the number of incidents reported and the rate per 1,000 persons for each type of offense, as of 2019.

Cities by population and crime rates

Demographics

2020 census

Note: the US Census treats Hispanic/Latino as an ethnic category. This table excludes Latinos from the racial categories and assigns them to a separate category. Hispanics/Latinos can be of any race.

The 2020 United States Census reported that Tulare County had a population of 473,117 and the population was spread out, with 31.0% under the age of 18, 69.0% from 18 to 64, 6.5% from 65 to 74, 3.2% from 75 to 84 and 1.4% who were 85 years of age or older. The median age was 31 years.

The racial makeup of Tulare County including Hispanics was 186,255 (39.4%) White, 6,668 (1.4%) African American, 10,645 (2.2%) Native American, 17,194 (3.6%) Asian, 723 (0.1%) Pacific Islander, 165,230 (34.9%) from other races, and 86,402 (18.2%) from two or more races. There were 309,895 people (65.5%) of Hispanic or Latino origin, of any race. 3.7% were of German, 3.2% English, 2.8% Irish, 2.4% Portuguese and 2.3% American ancestry according to Census 2020. 48.7% spoke English, 47.4% Spanish and 1.0% Indo-European as their first language.

There were 144,109 households, out of which 45.9% had children under the age of 18 living with them, 52.5% were married couples living together, 15.2% had a male householder with no spouse present, 24.1% had a female householder with no husband present, 20.8% were non-families, and 8.1% had someone living alone who was 65 years of age or older. The average household size was 3.20 and the average family size was 3.57.

There were 150,652 household units, and 141,987 occupied housing units in the county. The population density was 98.1 people per square mile (37.9/km2).

The median income for a household in the county was $57,692, and the median income for a family was $53,330. The per capita income for the county was $23,096. About 18.8% of the population were below the poverty line, including 26.0% of those under age 18 and 13.8% of those age 65 or over.

2011

Places by population, race, and income

2010 Census
The 2010 United States Census reported that Tulare County had a population of 442,179. The racial makeup of Tulare County was 265,618 (60.1%) White, 7,196 (1.6%) African American, 6,993 (1.6%) Native American, 15,176 (3.4%) Asian, 509 (0.1%) Pacific Islander, 128,263 (29.0%) from other races, and 18,424 (4.2%) from two or more races. There were 268,065 people (60.6%) of Hispanic or Latino origin, of any race.

2000 Census
As of the census of 2000, there were 368,021 people, 110,385 households, and 87,093 families residing in the county.  The population density was 76 people per square mile (29/km2).  There were 119,639 housing units at an average density of 25 per square mile (10/km2).  The racial makeup of the county was 58.1% White, 1.6% Black or African American, 1.6% Native American, 3.3% Asian, 0.1% Pacific Islander, 30.8% from other races, and 4.6% from two or more races.  50.8% of the population were Hispanic or Latino of any race. 6.2% were of American, 5.7% German and 5.0% English ancestry according to Census 2000. 56.3% spoke English, 38.9% Spanish and 1.1% Portuguese as their first language.

There were 110,385 households, out of which 44.9% had children under the age of 18 living with them, 58.1% were married couples living together, 14.5% had a female householder with no husband present, and 21.1% were non-families. 17.1% of all households were made up of individuals, and 7.7% had someone living alone who was 65 years of age or older.  The average household size was 3.28 and the average family size was 3.67.

In the county, the population was spread out, with 33.8% under the age of 18, 10.6% from 18 to 24, 27.6% from 25 to 44, 18.2% from 45 to 64, and 9.8% who were 65 years of age or older.  The median age was 29 years. For every 100 females there were 100.0 males.  For every 100 females age 18 and over, there were 97.7 males.

The median income for a household in the county was $33,983, and the median income for a family was $36,297. Males had a median income of $30,892 versus $24,589 for females. The per capita income for the county was $14,006.  About 18.8% of families and 23.9% of the population were below the poverty line, including 32.6% of those under age 18 and 10.5% of those age 65 or over.

Crime statistics
(reported by the sheriff's office or county police)

 Murders: 30
 Rapes: 40
 Robberies: 87
 Assaults: 411
 Burglaries: 1328
 Thefts: 2117
 Auto thefts: 11

Metropolitan Statistical Area
The United States Office of Management and Budget has designated Tulare County as the Visalia-Porterville, CA Metropolitan Statistical Area.  The United States Census Bureau ranked the Visalia-Porterville, CA Metropolitan Statistical Area as the 111th most populous metropolitan statistical area of the United States as of July 1, 2012.

The Office of Management and Budget has further designated the Visalia-Porterville, CA Metropolitan Statistical Area as a component of the more extensive Visalia-Porterville-Hanford, CA Combined Statistical Area, the 80th most populous combined statistical area and the 92nd most populous primary statistical area of the United States as of July 1, 2012.

According to the United States Census Bureau, Tulare County is the 7th largest county in California by total area.

Politics

Voter registration statistics

Cities by population and voter registration

Overview 
Tulare is a strongly Republican county in presidential and congressional elections. The last Democratic candidate for president to win a majority in the county was Lyndon Johnson in 1964. In the 2016 presidential election, Republican candidate and overall winner, Donald Trump, won Tulare by a 9.39% margin of victory, the closest margin of victory for a Republican in the county since Richard Nixon's 8.37% margin in 1960. The Republican advantage narrowed further in the 2020 presidential election when Donald Trump won the county by a 7.82% margin despite losing nationally to Joe Biden, the closest margin of victory for a Republican in the county since Dwight D. Eisenhower's 5.33% margin in 1956.

  
  
  
  
  
  
  
  
  
  
  
  
  
  
  
  
  
  
  
  
  
  
  
  
  
  
  
  
  
  
  

In the United States House of Representatives, Tulare County is split between three congressional districts:
 
  and
 .

In the California State Senate, it is split between three legislative districts:
 ,
 , and
 .

Economy

The dairy industry, with sales of milk products, brings in the most revenue for the county, typically more than US$1 billion a year annually.  Oranges, grapes, and cattle-related commodities also earn hundreds of millions of dollars annually.

In 2001, Tulare became the most productive county in the U.S. in terms of agricultural revenues, at US$3.5 billion annually. It surpassed Fresno County's US$3.2 billion, which had held the top spot for over two decades.  Due to the importance of agriculture in the county as well as its location in the state, since 1968 the city of Tulare has been the site of the annual World Ag Expo, the world's largest agricultural exposition.

Minor league sports teams, such as the baseball Visalia Rawhide of the class-A level California League (an affiliate to the Arizona Diamondbacks), two teams of the Minor League Football Association in Tulare and Visalia, and four teams of the Central California Basketball League based in Porterville, attract many residents and add to the amenities in the county.

Top employers
According to the county's 2020 Comprehensive Annual Financial Report, the top employers in the county are:

Utilities and infrastructure

Electricity service in Tulare County is provided by Southern California Edison and PG&E. Gas is provided by SoCalGas and PG&E. TV and Internet service is provided by several companies, such as Spectrum, DISH, DirecTV and HughesNET.

Communities

Cities

Dinuba
Exeter
Farmersville
Lindsay
Porterville
Tulare
Visalia (county seat)
Woodlake

Census designated places

Allensworth
Alpaugh
California Hot Springs
Camp Nelson
Cedar Slope
Cutler
Delft Colony
Ducor
Earlimart
East Orosi
East Porterville
East Tulare Villa
El Monte Mobile Village
El Rancho
Goshen
Hartland
Hypericum
Idlewild
Ivanhoe
Jovista
Kennedy Meadows
Lemon Cove
Lindcove
Linnell Camp
London
Matheny
McClenney Tract
Monson
Orosi
Panorama Heights
Patterson Tract
Pierpoint
Pine Flat
Pixley
Plainview
Ponderosa
Poplar-Cotton Center
Posey
Poso Park
Richgrove
Rodriguez Camp
Sequoia Crest
Seville
Silver City
Springville
Strathmore
Sugarloaf Mountain Park
Sugarloaf Saw Mill
Sugarloaf Village
Sultana
Terra Bella
Teviston
Three Rivers
Tipton
Tonyville
Tooleville
Traver
Waukena
West Goshen
Wilsonia
Woodville
Woodville Farm Labor Camp
Yettem

Other unincorporated communities

Advance
Angiola
Badger
Balance Rock
Cairns Corner
Calgro
Johnsondale
Kaweah
Rocky Hill
Ultra
White River
Yokohl Valley
Zante

Indian reservation
Tule River Indian Reservation

Population ranking

The population ranking of the following table is based on the 2020 census of Tulare County.

† county seat

See also 
List of museums in the San Joaquin Valley
National Register of Historic Places listings in Tulare County, California
Tulare Lake
Tule (Schoenoplectus acutus)

Notes

References

Further reading

 Jennifer Medina, "With Dry Taps and Toilets, California Drought Turns Desperate," New York Times, Oct. 2, 2014.

External links

Tulare County Agricultural Commissioner/Sealer official website (with Annual Crop and Livestock Reports)

 

 
California counties
San Joaquin Valley
1852 establishments in California
Populated places established in 1852
Majority-minority counties in California